Hermann Wilhelm Haupt was born in Germany in 1831.  He was a business clerk and became a member of the Communist League.  However, he betrayed the other defendants during the Cologne Communist Trial and was subsequently released by the police during the official investigation.

References

1831 births
German revolutionaries
German socialists
Year of death missing